Heintzman may refer to:

Theodor August Heintzman (1817-1899), Canadian piano manufacturer.
Heintzman & Co., the piano company started by the above.
Andrew Heintzman, Canadian journalist.